Giovanna Lacerti (born 1935) is an Italian artist.  Lacerti is a Latter-day Saint.

Sources
 Short bio on European artists
 Terryl L. Givens.  People of Paradox: A History of Mormon Culture. (Oxford: University Press, 2007) p. 338.
 

1935 births
Italian artists
Italian Latter Day Saints
Latter Day Saint artists
Living people